The Grandhotel Pupp is a 228-room luxury hotel located in Karlovy Vary (Carlsbad), Czech Republic. The hotel hosts the annual Karlovy Vary International Film Festival.

The hotel began as the Saxony Hall, built in 1701 by Burgomaster Deiml. A later mayor, Becher, built a Lusthaus on a plot of land he owned at right-angles to the Saxony Hall. This became known as the Bohemia Hall. Jan Jiří Pop, a confectioner, came to Carlsbad in 1760 and worked for a local confectioner called Mitterbach. The widow of former mayor Becher sold a one-third share in the Bohemia Hall to Mitterbach's daughter, who married Pop in 1775. The following year, she bought another third and her husband the remaining third, giving the Pop/Pupp family complete ownership of the hall. At that time, Jan Jiří Pop started to use the German variant of his name.

The family prospered in the following decades and was able to buy the Saxony Hall in 1890. Between 1896 and 1907, the Viennese architects Ferdinand Fellner and Hermann Helmer rebuilt the various family-owned buildings into the neo-Baroque Grandhotel Pupp that stands today. Up until the Second World War the family continued to acquire neighbouring properties and incorporate them into the hotel complex.

After the war, the Edvard Beneš government of Czechoslovakia nationalized the hotel and it was renamed Grandhotel Moskva in 1950. The hotel's owners, along with almost the totality of the Karlsbad's population, were expelled. The hotel's original name was restored in 1989 and it has since been privatized.

The Grandhotel Pupp was a major location for the 2006 movie Last Holiday starring Queen Latifah. It also appears in the 2006 James Bond film Casino Royale as Hotel Splendide in Montenegro. It has been cited as inspiration for the Grand Hotel Budapest in the movie of the same name.

External links

 Grandhotel Pupp

Buildings and structures completed in 1701
Hotels in the Czech Republic
Hotels established in 1701
Buildings and structures in Karlovy Vary
Art Nouveau architecture in the Czech Republic
Art Nouveau hotels
Hotel buildings completed in 1907
Fellner & Helmer buildings
1701 establishments in the Holy Roman Empire
1907 establishments in Austria-Hungary
Hotels established in 1907